Jafarullah Khan is a Pakistani politician who was the member of Gilgit Baltistan Legislative Assembly and served as the Deputy Speaker of Gilgit Baltistan Legislative Assembly from June 2015 till June 2020. He is a senior member of Pakistan Muslim League N (PML-N).

Education 
Jafarullah studied from the University of Agriculture, Faisalabad. Then he studied his college at Jama Millia College Karachi.

Political career 
Jafarullah Khan has also stayed as the spokesman of Pakistan Muslim League (N), Gilgit Baltistan.

Jafarullah Khan contested in GBLA-1 and got 7171 votes and won his seat in the Gilgit Baltistan Legislative Assembly. He became the deputy speaker of the Gilgit Baltistan Legislative Assembly.

References 

Living people
Gilgit-Baltistan MLAs 2015–2020
Year of birth missing (living people)
University of Agriculture, Faisalabad alumni